Something Else is the third studio album by American R&B singer Robin Thicke, released on September 30, 2008. It is a follow up to Thicke's highly successful second album The Evolution of Robin Thicke and features a guest appearance by Lil Wayne.

Background and Composition
After Robin Thicke finished his tour for The Evolution of Robin Thicke, he immediately went into the studio to start recording his next album. The album features production from Thicke and Pro J. Thicke describing the recording process of the album:  
The album drew musical comparisons from critics to the sounds of Philly soul, Motown, and disco funk which Thicke attributed to the use of live instruments, including string and horn sections.

The song "Dreamworld" muses about Thicke's ideal world in which there is, among other things, no poverty and racism. The song was partly inspired by his marriage to Paula Patton and observations of her personal and professional experiences as a black woman.

The song "Tie My Hands" was written by Thicke after the events of Hurricane Katrina in 2005. He was motivated to write the song by his own feelings concerning his inability to aid in the midst of the tragedy, saying, "What happened there greatly affected a lot of us Americans. Because, though we felt like these people deserved to be helped immediately, we couldn't help. Instead we were all just watching this debacle happen in front of our eyes." Months later, Thicke played his original iteration of the song for rapper Lil' Wayne which, according to Thicke, "moved" the New Orleans native. Thicke held on to the song and did not release it until he was contacted by Wayne in 2008 regarding it, which led to their collaboration, marking their third time featuring on the same track following "Shooter" and "All Night Long".

Thicke wrote the song “Shadow of Doubt” following a 2007 performance on The Oprah Winfrey Show (for which he felt uneasy and unprepared despite it being well-received); he described the song as being “about a nagging feeling of inadequacy, one that ceaselessly stalks, no matter how one ascends.”

Speaking in October 2008 to noted UK R&B writer Pete Lewis of the award-winning Blues & Soul, Thicke explained the lyrical background to 'Something Else': "With me I think there's always been a little bit of self-examination, spirituality and love in the music. But, where the last album was more me sitting around my house with my piano writing all these songs to make MYSELF feel better, this time I've started talking more about OTHER PEOPLE'S experiences, rather than just my own. The feeling I had while writing these songs was that I wanted to embrace people, and that I wanted to BE embraced."

Critical reception

The album received positive reviews from critics who compared his voice and style to Marvin Gaye.

Rolling Stone Magazine gave a mixed review to the album, giving 3 out of 5 stars saying:

"Robin Thicke offers a vanilla alternative. (No pun intended.) His largely self-produced third album picks up where his big 2007 hit "Lost Without U" left off, with Thicke cooing in an airy falsetto that holds promises of honesty, fidelity and long nights in the boudoir focused solely on Her Pleasure. The music is a lush, louche swirl of strings, congas and Fender Rhodes that flaunts its debts to Marvin Gaye ("You're My Baby"), classic disco ("Something Else") and Philly soul ("Magic"). As a utilitarian background soundtrack, it'll do nicely — lots of babies will be made to ballads like "Cry No More." But Thicke's songwriting teeters into self-parody, and his mixed metaphors — "We're just spaceships in the night/Ripping the clothes off of the past/Making a new path" — could break the mood of the randiest couples".

Chart performance and sales
The album debuted at number three on the US Billboard 200 selling 136,944 copies the first week. In its second week, the album fell to number 12, selling 38,577 copies, but rose back up to number 11 the next week. As of April 2009, the album has shifted over 435,000 units in the US.

Track listing

Personnel
Credits adapted from album’s liner notes.

 Joshua Beckman — digital editing (track 12)
 Sharon Bennett — backing vocals (track 10)
 Miguel Bermudez — recording and mixing assistant (track 12)
 Larry Cox II — organ (tracks 1-3, 6-8, 10); Rhodes (tracks 2, 4, 11); Wurlitzer, synth keys, and backing vocals (track 7); horn and string arrangements (track 8)
 Chuck Findley — trumpet (tracks 3, 8-10)
 Brian Gardner — mastering
 Gary Grant — trumpet (tracks 3, 8-10)
 Darius "Deezle" Harrison — engineer (track 12)
 Dan Higgins — saxophone (tracks 3, 8-10)
 Sean Hurley — bass (tracks 3, 4, 6, 10)
 Tavia Ivey — backing vocals (track 10)
 Suzy Katayama — strings conductor (tracks 3, 8, 9)
 Bobby Keyes — guitars (track 2, 4, 7, 9), acoustic guitar (tracks 4, 6), sitar and banjo (track 6)
 Josef Leimberg — trumpet (tracks 2, 3, 7, 8)
 Edward Lido — recording and mixing assistant
 Lil Wayne — rap (track 12)
 Bill Malina — engineer (tracks 1-9, 11, 12), mixing (tracks 2, 7)
 Greg Malone — bass (tracks 1, 2, 7, 9, 11)
 Fabian Marasciullo — mixing (track 12)
 Andrew McKay — guitars (tracks 2-4, 6, 7, 11)
 Dwight Mikkelsen — strings conductor (track 11)
 Charlie Morillas — trombone (tracks 3, 8-10)
 Jerahm Orozco — saxophone (tracks 2, 7, 8)
 Pro J — producer (all tracks), engineer (track 5), drums (tracks 1-4, 7, 9-11), percussion (tracks 1, 2, 6, 10, 11), string arrangements (tracks 3, 8, 11), horn arrangements (tracks 3, 8), guitar (tracks 1, 3, 10), piano (tracks 3, 10), instrumentation (tracks 5-12), congas (tracks 4, 7), bongos (track 3), tambourine (track 7), bass (track 8), keyboards (track 9)
 Alfredo Rivera — flute (tracks 2, 7, 8)
 Nicole Scherzinger — backing vocals (track 9)
 Isaac C. Smith — trombone (tracks 2, 3, 7, 8)
 Sherdale Smith — backing vocals (track 10)
 Robin Thicke — lead vocals (all tracks), producer (all tracks), backing vocals (tracks 1, 3-7, 9, 10), horn arrangements (tracks 2, 3, 7-10), string arrangements (tracks 3, 8, 9, 11), piano (tracks 8, 9), percussion (tracks 8, 11), Rhodes (track 1), shaker and tambourine (track 3), sleigh bells (track 4), guitar and synthesizer (track 11), instrumentation (track 12)
 Rich Travali — mixing (tracks 1, 3, 10, 11)
 Candace Wakefield — backing vocals (track 10)
 Brian Warfield — trumpet (tracks 2, 3, 7, 8)
 Kamasi Washington — saxophone (track 3)
 La-Niece Williams — backing vocals (track 10)

Charts

Weekly charts

Year-end charts

References

2008 albums
Robin Thicke albums
Albums produced by Robin Thicke
Star Trak Entertainment albums